Punk Goes Christmas is the fourteenth compilation album of the Punk Goes... series. It was released on 5 November 2013, through Fearless Records.

Background and release
This album, compared to the other albums in the Punk Goes... series received little press. The album was announced in a trailer posted online by Fearless Records in October 2013, along with the album's artwork and full track listing. The album was released and available to stream online on November 4 the same year. It is also one of the only  Punk Goes... albums to contain original songs, however it does still contain cover songs.

Critical reception

Mark Deming from AllMusic praised the album's range of sounds, ranging from pop punk to metalcore. Edward Strickson of Alter the Press! gave the album a 4/5 score, praising its surprisingly festive characteristics and went on to say that "Fool's Holiday" by All Time Low may be one of the best songs they have made.

Deluxe edition
In November 2015, Fearless Records released a deluxe edition of Punk Goes Christmas with four additional tracks added to the original Punk Goes Christmas album. The songs on the album that were added were three additional covers and one new original song titled "12 Days of a Pop-Punk Christmas" performed by YouTube comedian Jarrod Alonge, credited to his fictitious YouTube band Sunrise Skater Kids. The first song from the deluxe edition is August Burns Red's cover of the Home Alone Theme, originally composed by John Williams.

Track listing

Deluxe Edition

Sampler track listing
Punk Goes Christmas also included a sampler CD containing eight previously released songs by bands from the Fearless Record label.

Charts and release history
Charts

Release history

References

Punk Goes series
2013 Christmas albums
Christmas compilation albums
Fearless Records compilation albums